Teng may refer to:

Teng (surname) (滕), a Chinese surname
Teng (state), an ancient Chinese state
Teng (mythology), a flying dragon in Chinese mythology
Teng County, a county in Guangxi, China
Triboelectric nanogenerator, a method of power generation based on charge transfer between dissimilar materials